Eucosma ottoniana is a species of moth of the family Tortricidae. It is found in China and Russia.

References

Moths described in 1918
Eucosmini